The 2015 Challenger Banque Nationale de Drummondville was a professional tennis tournament played on indoor hard courts. It was the 9th edition of the tournament, the 1st in its current location, and part of the 2015 ATP Challenger Tour, offering a total of $50,000 in prize money. It took place in Drummondville, Canada between March 16 and March 22, 2015.

Singles main draw entrants

Seeds

1 Rankings are as of March 9, 2015

Other entrants
The following players received wildcards into the singles main draw:
 Philip Bester
 Pavel Krainik
 Filip Peliwo
 David Volfson

The following player entered the singles main draw with a protected ranking:
 Tennys Sandgren

The following players received entry as alternates:
 Gonzalo Escobar
 Germain Gigounon
 Jason Jung
 Dimitar Kutrovsky
 Marek Michalička
 Eduardo Struvay

The following players received entry from the qualifying draw:
 Félix Auger-Aliassime (withdrew, abdominal strain)
 Matteo Donati
 Adam El Mihdawy
 Kevin King

The following player received entry as a lucky loser:
 Fritz Wolmarans

Champions

Singles

 John-Patrick Smith def.  Frank Dancevic, 6–7(11–13), 7–6(7–3), 7–5

Doubles

 Philip Bester /  Chris Guccione def.  Frank Dancevic /  Frank Moser, 6–4, 7–6(8–6)

External links
Official website

Challenger Banque Nationale de Drummondville
Challenger de Drummondville
Challenger Banque Nationale de Drummondville